Saido Patti is a village in Hoshiarpur, Punjab, India. 
Its pincode is 146102.

Cities and towns in Hoshiarpur district